Sardeh or Sar Deh may refer to:
 Sardeh, Gilan
 Sar Deh, Razavi Khorasan
 Sardeh, Razavi Khorasan
 Sardeh, Sistan and Baluchestan